Brazil women's national softball team is the national team for Brazil. The team qualified to compete at the 2015 Pan American Games in Toronto, Canada.

References

External links 
 International Softball Federation

Softball
Women's national softball teams
Softball in Brazil
Softball